"Dah Dah DahDah" is a song by American rapper Nardo Wick from the deluxe version of his debut studio album Who Is Nardo Wick? (2022). Produced by Trademark and Wheretfisray, it contains an interpolation of "Tom's Diner" by Suzanne Vega. In the song, Nardo Wick raps about street life and the violence that accompanies it.

Music video
The official music video was released on August 16, 2022. Directed by Dell Nie, it shows Nardo Wick standing in the rain in a warehouse around dead bodies and rapping alongside baby grand pianos with guns on them.

Charts

References

2022 songs
Nardo Wick songs